Steve Roloff is a paralympic equestrian from the United States. Steve competed in the 1984 Summer Paralympics and won a gold medal in Equestrian for Elementary Walk/Trot C3/6.

References

External links 
 

Living people
American male equestrians
Paralympic equestrians of the United States
Paralympic gold medalists for the United States
Paralympic silver medalists for the United States
Paralympic medalists in equestrian
Equestrians at the 1984 Summer Paralympics
Medalists at the 1984 Summer Paralympics
Year of birth missing (living people)